ABC Radio Sydney (official call sign: 2BL, formerly 2SB) is an ABC radio station in Sydney, Australia. It is the flagship station in the ABC Local Radio network and broadcasts on 702 kHz on the AM dial.

History 
ABC Radio Sydney is the first public radio station in Australia opened in Sydney at 8:00pm on 23 November 1923. Its first callsign was 2SB where 2 denotes the State of New South Wales and SB stood for Sydney Broadcasters Limited. However, the callsign was soon altered to 2BL for Sydney Broadcasters Limited. The change was due to the audio similarity of the sounds FC and SB.
In May 1928 the Sydney Broadcasting Company was formed to take over stations 2BL and 2FC.

A year later a consortium of entertainment companies founded the Australian Broadcasting Company Limited (ABC) to supply programme material to 2BL, 2FC and similar "A-class" stations in other capital cities.
2BL became one of the inaugural stations, along with sister station 2FC, in the government-owned Australian Broadcasting Commission (also ABC) network when it was founded in 1932. In 1946, it became the flagship of the National Programme, forerunner of Radio National.  It also began carrying parliamentary broadcasts.  In 1963, it swapped formats with 2FC and assumed that station's old role as flagship of the Interstate Programme, which eventually evolved into Local Radio.  However, it continued to air parliament until 1988.  2BL was re-branded as 702 ABC Sydney in 2000 and then ABC Radio Sydney in 2017.

In the second radio ratings survey of 2012, Nielsen Media Research recorded 702's share of the Sydney radio market as the second largest at 10.3%, behind commercial talk station 2GB.
 	
Most Local Radio stations in New South Wales simulcast 702's programming when not airing local shows for their areas.  The exception is 999 ABC Broken Hill, which relays 891 ABC Adelaide due to Broken Hill being on Central Time.

Programs

Daily scheduling
Breakfast, with James Valentine - 5:30am - 8:00am
AM, with Sabra Lane - 8:00am - 8:30am

Mornings, with Sarah Macdonald - 8:30am - 11:00am 
Conversations, with Richard Fidler and Sarah Kanowski (Radio National) - 11:00am - 12:00midday
The World Today, with Sally Sara - 12:00midday - 12:30pm
Afternoons, with Josh Szeps - 12:30pm - 3:30pm
Drive, with Richard Glover - 3:30pm - 6:30pm
PM, with David Lipson - 6:30pm - 7:00pm
 Evenings, with Indira Naidoo - 7:00pm - 10:00pm
 Nightlife, with Philip Clark (Monday - Thursday) and Suzanne Hill (Friday - Sunday)- 10:00pm - 2:00am
 Overnights, with Trevor Chappell (Monday - Thursday from Melbourne) and Rod Quinn (Friday - Sunday from Sydney) - 2:00am - 6:00am

Other programs 
 Thank God it's Friday is broadcast every Friday on Richard Glover's Drive show and features a roundup of the week's events, featuring various Australian comedians. TGIF is also available as a podcast.
 Norman the Quiz, the pet-name for what used to be simply known as "The Quiz", is hosted by Sarah MacDonald every weekday evening. It is broadcast to all of New South Wales and the ACT
 The Mighty Challenge is a quiz broadcast at midnight (local time) by Phillip Clark. 
 Grandstand is the ABC's sport program, which is broadcast from 12 noon on a Saturday and Sunday
 Weekends, with Simon Marnie
 Speaking Out (Radio National), with Larissa Behrendt

Former presenters

Deborah Cameron
Mike Carlton
Angela Catterns
Andrew Daddo
Dom Knight 
Julie McCrossin 
Andrew Olle
James O'Loghlin 
Clive Robertson
Adam Spencer
Virginia Trioli
Sally Loane
David Dale
Frank Crook
Ray Taylor
John Doyle
John Hall
Margaret Throsby
Bruce Menzies

External links and references

 702 ABC Sydney
 ABC Online

Sydney
Radio stations in Sydney
Radio stations established in 1923